Newcastle Jets Football Club is an Australian professional association football club based in Waratah West, Newcastle. The club was formed 2000 as Newcastle United Jets. They became the one of the three members from the New South Wales admitted into the A-League, having spent their first four seasons participating in the National Soccer League.

Key
Key to league competitions:

 A-League – Australia's top soccer league, established in 2005
 NSL – The first tier of Australian football until the inception of the A-League in 2005.

Key to colours and symbols:

Key to league record:
 Season = The year and article of the season
 Pos = Final position
 Pld = Games played
 W = Games won
 D = Games drawn
 L = Games lost
 GF = Goals scored
 GA = Goals against
 Pts = Points

Key to cup record:
 En-dash (–) = Newcastle Jets did not participate
 R32 = Round of 32
 R16 = Round of 16
 QF = Quarter-finals
 SF = Semi-finals
 RU = Runners-up
 W = Winners

Seasons

See also
 Australian clubs in the AFC Champions League

References
aleaguestats.com

Newcastle Jets FC seasons
Newcastle Jets FC
N